FRED may refer to:

Entertainment and publications 
 FRED (quartet), singers
 FЯED (Fred Figglehorn), US comedian
 FRED (disk magazine) for the SAM Coupé

Computing and software 
FRED (text editor)
FRED (The FRED Computer Language) is Framework (office suite) built-in integrated interpreter
Fred Optical Engineering Software
A 1971 computer developed into the RCA 1802

Transportation
 Nickname for Lockheed C-5 Galaxy aircraft
 End-of-train device, a.k.a. Flashing Rear End Device (FRED)
Fredericksburg Regional Transit, Virginia, US

Other uses
 Fred's, US stores, NASDAQ symbol
 FRED (jeweller)
 Federal Reserve Economic Data, Federal Reserve Bank of St. Louis, US database
 Field Ration Eating Device, an Australian Army knife/spoon/etc. combination

See also
 Forum for Renewable Energy Development in Scotland (FREDS)
 Fred (disambiguation)